Sons Find Devils is a live performance anthology by the Irish post-punk band Virgin Prunes. It was issued by Cleopatra Records on 13 January 1998.

Track listing

Release history

References

External links 
 

1998 live albums
Cleopatra Records live albums
Virgin Prunes albums